Shivyar (also Romanized as Shīvyār) is a village in Tirchai Rural District, Kandovan District, Meyaneh County, East Azerbaijan Province, Iran. At the 2006 census, its population was 266, in 86 families.

References 

Populated places in Meyaneh County